Donald Charles Pinhey (December 20, 1930 – November 13, 2014) was an American gridiron football player and coach of football and baseball.  He played professionally for the Ottawa Rough Riders of the Canadian Football League (CFL).   He was named an all-star for the 1956 CFL season.  Pinhey played college football at Muskingum University.  Pinhey served as the head football coach at Dakota Wesleyan University in Mitchell, South Dakotafrom 1959 to 1962 and at Wilmington College in Wilmington, Ohio from 1963 to 1966, compiling a career college football coaching record of 17–44–3.  He was the head baseball coach at the United States Coast Guard Academy in New London, Connecticut from 1968 to 1999, amassing a record of 357–476–5.

Head coaching record

Football

References

External links
 

1930 births
2014 deaths
American players of Canadian football
Canadian football linebackers
Coast Guard Bears baseball coaches
Coast Guard Bears football coaches
Dakota Wesleyan Tigers football coaches
Muskingum Fighting Muskies football players
Ottawa Rough Riders players
Wilmington Quakers baseball coaches
Wilmington Quakers football coaches